Yarovoy, Yarovaya or Yarovoye may refer to:

Yarovoy (surname)
 Yarovoye Urban Okrug, a municipal formation which the town of krai significance of Yarovoye in Altai Krai, Russia is incorporated as
 Yarovoy (inhabited locality) (Yarovaya, Yarovoye), several inhabited localities in Russia
Lyubov Yarovaya, a play by Konstantin Trenyov and several derived works, such as Lyubov Yarovaya, a 1953 drama film
Yarovaya law, Russian counter-terrorism regulation